Moses Breaking the Tablets of the Law is a 1659 oil-on-canvas painting of the prophet Moses by the Dutch artist Rembrandt. It depicts Moses about to break the original two stone tablets inscribed with the Ten Commandments. It is now in the Gemäldegalerie, Berlin.

Bibliography 
 Kristin Bahre u. a. (Hrsg.): Rembrandt. Genie auf der Suche. DuMont Literatur und Kunst, Köln 2006. 
 Christian Tümpel: Rembrandt. Rowohlt Taschenbuch Verlag, Reinbek 2006. .
 Shalom Sabar, “Between Calvinists and Jews: Hebrew Script in Rembrandt’s Art,” in: Beyond the Yellow Badge: Anti-Judaism and Antisemitism in Medieval and Early European Modern Visual Culture, ed. Mitchell B. Merback (Leiden and Boston: Brill), pp. 371–404, 559–73. https://www.academia.edu/3359148/_Between_Calvinists_and_Jews_Hebrew_Script_in_Rembrandt_s_Art_

1659 paintings
Paintings by Rembrandt
Paintings in the Gemäldegalerie, Berlin
Paintings depicting Moses
Ten Commandments in art